Yelü Yanchege, King of Qi (935–972) was a prince of the Liao dynasty. He was the second son of Emperor Taizong of Liao and the second younger brother of Emperor Muzong. He was honoured as Crown Prince Qinjing (欽靖皇太叔). After his nephew Emperor Jingzong succeeded to the throne, he was promoted to the King of Qi, and his consort Xiao Hunian became the Queen of Qi. In 972, he died and Xiao Hunian received the title of Consort Dowager. After he died, his consort took over as head of his army and became the commander in chief of an expeditionary force against border tribes in the west in 994 and led her troops in a campaign against the Western Xia, where she was credited with the establishment of the northwestern city of Kodun.

In popular culture
Portrayed by Tan Kai in the 2020 Chinese TV series The Legend of Xiao Chuo.

References

935 births
970 deaths
Liao dynasty people
10th-century Khitan people
Yelü clan
Liao dynasty politicians